The Tri-County Conference (TCC) is an MHSAA athletic league currently located in Hillsdale, Lenawee, and Monroe Counties.

Member schools

Current members

The following schools are currently members:

Associate members

Former members

History
The league began with the 1973-74 sports season. The charter members were Britton-Macon, Deerfield, and Madison in Lenawee Country, St. Thomas (Now Father Gabriel Richard) and Whitmore Lake in Washtenaw County, and Summerfield in Monroe County. Whiteford would leave the Michigan-Ohio Border Conference and Sand Creek would leave the Lenawee County Athletic Association (LCAA) to join the TCC beginning in the 1975-76 sports season, while St. Thomas would depart to be an independent at the conclusion of the season. Morenci would leave the LCAA and join the conference in 1981. In 2007, Clinton would also leave the LCAA to join the conference. This would give the TCC 9 member schools at one time.

Britton-Macon and Deerfield combined all sports starting with the 2009-10 sports season, although they already were combining some sports for several years. Their districts combined on July 1, 2011 into the Britton-Deerfield School District.

In 2018, Whitmore Lake elected to leave the conference in favor of joining the Michigan Independent Athletic Conference for the 2019-2020 season. However, Erie Mason was invited to join the TCC in its place beginning in the 2020-21 athletic year.

In 2019, Clinton announced it would depart the conference and return to LCAA beginning in the 2020-21 athletic year. To take their place, Pittsford announced they would join the league as an associate member in football, wrestling, and bowling. This move came as a result of every other member of the Southern Central Athletic Association (SCAA) moving to 8-man football. Pittsford would remain in the SCAA for all other sports.

In 2020, Britton-Deerfield announced that they would be dropping down to 8-man football, due a lack of numbers in the program. In 2021, they would form the Tri-River 8 Conference, an 8-man football only conference, along with 4 other schools.

After the conclusion of the 2021 football season, both Morenci and Pittsford announced they would be transitioning to 8-man football for the 2022 season, both due to a lack of numbers within their respective programs. Morenci will join the Tri-River 8 Conference and Pittsford will return to the SCAA's 8-man conference in 2022, remaining a TCC member in bowling only. The TCC will only have five schools playing 11-man football beginning in 2022: Erie Mason, Madison, Sand Creek, Summerfield, and Whiteford.

On June 27, 2022 the Madison board of education voted to leave the conference after the 2022-23 school year to join the Lenawee County Athletic Association. Concurrently, the league began discussions with the Toledo Area Athletic Conference about a possible merger. Following the announcement of Madison's departure, Lenawee Christian would apply for membership and would be accepted into the conference, beginning with the 2023-24 school year.

Football
This list goes through the 2022 season.

References

Tri-County Conference Historian Blog History, Records, Daily Update Blog by TCC Historian

Michigan high school sports conferences
High school sports conferences and leagues in the United States
1973 establishments in Michigan